Right to Die is an American drama television film that premiered on NBC on October 12, 1987. Directed by Paul Wendkos and written by Phil Penningroth, it is based on articles in The New York Times written by Andrew H. Malcolm. The film stars Raquel Welch and Michael Gross, with Bonnie Bartlett, Peter Michael Goetz, and Joanna Miles in supporting roles. It was nominated for three Primetime Emmy Awards and Welch was nominated for a Golden Globe Award for her performance.

Right to Die was one of three films that Welch said she was most proud of.

Plot
Emily Bauer is a successful psychologist who is living the ideal family life until she is suddenly diagnosed with the dreaded neurological condition called ALS, better known as Lou Gehrig's disease. In the beginning stages, she puts up a courageous fight against this terrible affliction, but her condition is deteriorating, which eventually leaves her in a vegetative state. Emily then pleads with her husband to help her die.

Cast

Reception

Critical response
The New York Times television critic John J. O'Connor called Right to Die a "rare made-for-television movie that keeps veering away from easy expectations". Don Shirley of the Los Angeles Times described the first half of the film as "a clunky piece of storytelling that much of the audience may tune out" and wrote that "the woman's joie de vivre is expressed via imagery that looks like it was inspired by commercials (Paul Wendkos directed), and Penningroth's dialogue says all the usual things, in all the usual ways". Clifford Terry of the Chicago Tribune stated that "the movie, like Whose Life Is It Anyway?, devotes most of its time to tough, complex moral and ethical questions, including a dialogue on the nature of suffering" and "the flashbacks, while dramatically convenient, are intrusive and make the movie choppy". All three critics praised Welch's performance, with O'Connor writing: "Ms. Welch gives an enormously affecting performance as Emily Bauer, not only uncompromising but also admirably sensitive to the larger intentions of the film". Gross's performance was also praised, with Terry writing: "Gross gives a surprisingly adequate performance".

Accolades

References

External links
 
 

1987 films
1987 drama films
1987 television films
1980s American films
1980s English-language films
American drama television films
American films based on actual events
Drama films based on actual events
Television films based on actual events
Films about diseases
Films about euthanasia
Films directed by Paul Wendkos
Films scored by Brad Fiedel
NBC network original films
Amyotrophic lateral sclerosis